The 2018 Motorcycle Grand Prix of the Americas was the third round of the 2018 MotoGP season. It was held at the Circuit of the Americas in Austin on 22 April 2018.

Classification

MotoGP

Moto2

Moto3

Championship standings after the race

MotoGP

Moto2

Moto3

Notes

References

Americas
Grand Prix of the Americas
Motorcycle Grand Prix of the Americas
Motorcycle Grand Prix of the Americas